Letshanaa Karupathevan (born 19 August 2003) is a Malaysian badminton player.

Career
In 2018, Letshanaa was among the players that won a bronze at the 2018 Jakarta mixed team. On the same year, she won her first international tournament winning the women singles of the 2018 Mauritius International. She made her name in 2019 when she won the national Under-18 title as a 14-year-old and joined the national back-up squad in 2020. In 2021, she was part of the Malaysian squad that won bronze at the 2021 Sudirman Cup. In February 2022, Letshanaa resigned from Badminton Association of Malaysia due to back injury. As an independent player, she trained at the Fly Spirit Badminton Club in Selayang and Sungai Buloh under the tutelage of her brother, K. Jhotiswaran and father, A. Karupathevan. She rejoined the national badminton team on 1 March 2023.

Achievement

BWF International Challenge/Series (2 titles, 1 runner-up) 
Women singles

  BWF International Challenge tournament
  BWF International Series tournament
  BWF Future Series tournament

BWF Junior International (1 runner-up) 
Girls' singles

  BWF Junior International Grand Prix tournament
  BWF Junior International Challenge tournament
  BWF Junior International Series tournament
  BWF Junior Future Series tournament

References

External links 
 

2003 births
Living people
People from Perak
Malaysian people of Tamil descent
Malaysian sportspeople of Indian descent
Malaysian female badminton players